Lead Me Not is the debut album of American country music artist Lari White. It was issued in 1993 on the Nashville division of RCA Records. White produced the album along with Rodney Crowell and Eagles guitarist Steuart Smith. In addition, she wrote or co-wrote eight of the album's ten tracks.

The album's three singles — "What a Woman Wants", the title track, and "Lay Around and Love on You" — all charted on the Billboard Hot Country Singles & Tracks (now Hot Country Songs) charts, although all three failed to make Top 40. The album itself peaked at #36 on the Billboard Top Heatseekers charts.

In 2020, it was reported that the official music video for "Lead Me Not" had gone missing. According to the piece, the record label claimed to have no knowledge of the music video and no copy of the video production in their vault.

Track listing
"Itty Bitty Single Solitary Piece O' My Heart" (Lari White, John Rotch) – 3:28
"Just Thinking" (White) – 3:30
"Lay Around and Love on You" (Bobby David, David Gillon) – 2:54
"Lead Me Not" (White) – 4:06
"Made to Be Broken" (White) – 3:56
"What a Woman Wants" (White, Chuck Cannon) – 3:04
"Anything Goes" (Suzi Ragsdale, Verlon Thompson) – 3:10
"When the Lights Are Low" (White, Chris Waters) – 2:54
"Don't Leave Me Lonely" (White, Cannon) – 3:29
"Good Good Love" (White, Rotch) – 4:04

"Anything Goes" is omitted from the cassette version.

Personnel
Adapted from Lead Me Not liner notes.
 Dale Armstrong - percussion (5), tea steeper (7), entry bell (7), "more rockin' bongos" (7)
 Joy Askew - harmony vocals (8, 10)
 Eddie Bayers - drums (2, 4, 8)
 Larry Byrom - electric guitar (10)
 Chuck Cannon - harmony vocals (3, 4)
 Rodney Crowell - "super evolved" harmony vocal (7)
 Jerry Douglas - Dobro (1)
 Radney Foster - "tag team" harmony vocal (4)
 Robert Greenidge - steel drums (7)
 Jim Horn - tenor saxophone (4)
 John Barlow Jarvis - piano (3), "Wurlitzer-ish" (3)
 Randy Leago - organ (3), accordion (7)
 Albert Lee - electric guitar (1, 2, 6, 7, 8, 10), acoustic guitar (4, 7), Korg T3 (5)
 Mark Luna - "ridiculously high" harmony vocals (1), harmony vocals (3)
 Terry McMillan - harmonica (3)
 Bill Payne - "gumbo piano" (1), piano (2, 4, 5, 6, 8, 9, 10), Hammond organ (6), Korg T3 (7), organ (10)
 Michael Rhodes - bass guitar (1, 2, 3, 4, 6, 8, 9, 10), fretless bass (5, 7)
 Vince Santoro - drums (1, 3, 5, 6, 10), cowbell (1), harmony vocals (3, 6, 10), kick drum (7), claves (7), cymbals (7)
 Stephony Smith - harmony vocals (1, 4)
 Steuart Smith - electric guitar (1, 4, 5, 8, 10), acoustic guitar (1, 2, 5, 7, 8, 10), all guitars (3), classical guitar (5)
 Tommy Spurlock - pedal steel guitar (8)
 Russ Taff - "featured soul vocal" (10)
 Jonathan Yudkin - violin (8)

Strings on "Just Thinking" and "Don't Leave Me Lonely"
Connie Ellisor, John Catchings, Anthony LaMarchina, Bob Mason, Julia Tanner, Jim Grosjean, Kathryn Plummer, Kristin Wilkinson, David Davidson, Carl Gorodetzky, Lee Larrison, Ted Madsen, Laura Molyneaux, Pamela Sixfin, Alan Umstead

"RC and the Moonpie Choir" on "Good Good Love"
Rodney Crowell, Vince Santoro, Joy Askew, Stephony Smith, Mark Luna, Russ Taff, Jonell Mosser, Connie Reeder, Chuck Cannon, Jackie Welch, Claudia Church, Peter Penrose, Lari White

Technical
 Donivan Cowart - recording
 Rodney Crowell - producer
Glenn Meadows - mastering
Roger Nichols - engineer, recording, mixing
 Stephony Smith - producer
Bergen White - string arrangement (2, 9)
Lari White - producer

References

1993 debut albums
RCA Records albums
Lari White albums
Albums produced by Rodney Crowell
Albums produced by Lari White